Radio Verite is a Haitian radio station based out of East Orange, New Jersey that provides news on politics, and social policies. It also has a Christian format as a number of local Haitian Pentecostal ministers host shows and religious content in French and Haitian Creole.

References

External links
 Listen Online on ZenoLive

Radio stations in Haiti